Karavan is a village in Batken Region of Kyrgyzstan. Its population was 8,657 in 2021. Administratively, it is part of the city Kyzyl-Kiya.

References

Populated places in Batken Region